Jan Svěrák (born 6 February 1965 in Žatec) is a Czech film director. He is the son of screenwriter and actor Zdeněk Svěrák. He studied documentary filmmaking at the FAMU. He and his films have received awards including the Academy Award, Crystal Globe, Golden Globe Award, and Tokyo Grand Prix.

He lives in Prague.

Filmography

References

External links
 
 Personal website
 Jan Svěrák  - profile
 Biography

1965 births
Living people
People from Žatec
Czech film directors
Czechoslovak film directors
Czech screenwriters
Male screenwriters
German-language film directors
Academy of Performing Arts in Prague alumni
Directors of Best Foreign Language Film Academy Award winners